The Lobbying Disclosure Act of 1995 was legislation in the United States aimed at bringing increased accountability to federal lobbying practices in the United States.  The law was amended substantially by the Honest Leadership and Open Government Act of 2007. Under provisions which took effect on January 1, 1996, federal lobbyists are required to register with the Clerk of the United States House of Representatives and the Secretary of the United States Senate.  Anyone failing to do so is punishable by a civil fine of up to $50,000. The clerk and secretary must refer any acts of non-compliance to the United States Attorney for the District of Columbia.

A consequence of the act is that the act "removed from Foreign Agents Registration Act a class of agents who are engaged in lobbying activities and who register under the LDA. This Act is administered by Congress."

Bill provisions

Definitions 
The LDA defines a number of provisions attempting to maintain a degree of transparency in the activities of lobbyists.  The legislation defines a client as "any person or entity that employs or retains another person for financial or other compensation to conduct lobbying activities on behalf of that person or entity. A person or entity whose employees act as lobbyists on its own behalf is both a client and an employer of such employees." The legislation also defines "lobbyist": "The term "lobbyist" means any individual who is employed or retained by a client for financial or other compensation for services that include more than one lobbying contact, other than an individual whose lobbying activities constitute less than 20 percent of the time engaged in the services provided by such individual to that client over a three-month period". Also included in the legislation are the definitions of what actions must be disclosed which includes lobbying to certain members of the Executive Branch who are included on specific payrolls.  Also included are members of Congress.

Exceptions 
The legislation does not include those lobbyists whose "activities constitute less than 20 percent of the time engaged in services", thus failing to regulate grassroots (small donors) lobbying.  The LDA includes a number of other "thresholds" that define what must be recorded. Any organization that spends more than $10,000 towards lobbying activities must also be registered.  Amounts even slightly below this threshold are exempt from reporting.  The outline for registration includes "name, address, business telephone number, and principal place of business of the registrant, and a general description of its business or activities", as well as for the client.  The register must also include a statement of what issues the registrant expects to lobby or what may have already been lobbied.

After recording, the records are maintained by the Clerk of the House and the Secretary of the Senate.  Due to severe understaffing, these two offices are unable to check for illegal activities or corrupt practices, which is the most glaring shortcoming of the legislation.

During a hearing before the Senate Committee on Rules and Administration, Senator Christopher Dodd stated that "[s]ince 2003, the Office of Public Records has referred over 2,000 cases to the Department of Justice, and nothing's been heard from them again".

See also 
 Lobbying in the United States
1996 United States campaign finance controversy
Federal Regulation of Lobbying Act of 1946

References

External links
 Lobbying Disclosure Act of 1995 (PDF/details) as amended in the GPO Statute Compilations collection

Lobbying in the United States
United States federal government administration legislation
Acts of the 104th United States Congress